Kanayatn may refer to:
 Kanayatn language, a Malayic Dayak language spoken in Borneo
 Kanayatn people, an ethnic group of the Dayak people group from Borneo